Piddle may refer to:

 Piddle Brook, a watercourse in Worcestershire, England
 River Piddle, a river in Dorset, England
 Piddles, a character in the video game Banjo-Kazooie: Nuts & Bolts
 A slang term for urine and urination

See also
 Wyre Piddle, Worcestershire, England